Stone Child College (SCC) is a public tribal land-grant community college in Box Elder, Montana. SCC is affiliated with the Chippewa-Cree Tribe and located on the Rocky Boy Indian Reservation in north central Montana; it is one of seven Tribal Colleges in Montana. In 2008–09, SCC had an enrollment of 511, of whom 98 percent were American Indian descent; 20 percent were bilingual or of limited English proficiency. SCC students range in age from 17 to 72, with the average age at 30. The college retention rate is 47 percent and the graduation rate is 20 percent.

History
SCC was chartered by the Chippewa-Cree Business Committee on May 17, 1984. In 1994, the college was designated a land-grant college alongside 31 other tribal colleges.

Academics
Stone Child offers a Bachelor degree along with Associate degrees in seventeen disciplines and six certificates.

Athletics
Basketball: In August 2010 Stone Child College, along with the other tribal colleges around Montana, formed the Montana Tribal Colleges Basketball League.  Presently, the college has both a men's and women's team.

Partnerships
SCC is a member of the American Indian Higher Education Consortium (AIHEC), which is a community of tribally and federally chartered institutions working to strengthen tribal nations and make a lasting difference in the lives of American Indians and Alaska Natives. SCC was created in response to the higher education needs of American Indians. SCC generally serves geographically isolated populations that have no other means accessing education beyond the high school level.

See also
American Indian College Fund (AICF)

References

External links
 Official website

Two-year colleges in the United States
American Indian Higher Education Consortium
Universities and colleges accredited by the Northwest Commission on Colleges and Universities
Tribal Colleges in Montana
Education in Chouteau County, Montana
Education in Hill County, Montana
Educational institutions established in 1984
1984 establishments in Montana